Wong Bik-wan (Cantonese pronunciation) or Huang Biyun (Mandarin pronunciation, ; born 1961) is a Hong Kong writer. She has received multiple literary awards in Hong Kong,  and is cited in The Cambridge History of Chinese Literature as a major contemporary writer.

Early life
Wong was born into a Hong Kong Hakka family. She did part of her high school in Taiwan.

Education and early career
Wong graduated from The Chinese University of Hong Kong with a BA majoring in journalism and communication in 1984. She then worked as a screenwriter for TVB for a year. In 1987, she studied French and French literature at Université Paris 1 Panthéon-Sorbonne. In 1988, she travelled to New York to work at a Chinese-language press in New York. She then received her MA degree in criminology under the Department of Sociology in the University of Hong Kong. Meanwhile, she also obtained a Diploma of Legal Studies in the HKU School of Professional and Continuing Education. Apart from her work as a fiction writer, she has worked as a reporter for The Standard, as a legislative assistant, and as a screenwriter for a broadcasting company.

Writing style 
Although her use of words and style often change with time, she still sticks to common themes like death, diseases, love and darkness. Some touch upon the year 1997 when Hong Kong was handed over to the People's Republic of China.

Notable awards and recognition

Works

Novels and short stories 
小城無故事 Xiaocheng wu gushi [No stories in a small town] (1990, a compilation)
溫柔與暴烈 Wenrou yu baolie, Tenderness and Violence (1994)
她是女子，我也是女子 Ta shi nüzi, wo ye shi nüzi [She's a woman, I'm a woman] (1994)
七宗罪 Qi zong zui [Seven deadly sins] (1997)
突然我記起你的臉 Turan wo jiqi ni de lian [Suddenly I recall your face] (1998)
烈女圖 Lienü tu [Portraits of martyred women] (1999)
七種靜默 Qi zhong jingmo [Seven types of silence] (2000)
媚行者 Meixing zhe [Beautiful sojourner] (2000)
十二女色 Shier nüse [Twelve female charms] (2000)
無愛紀 Wuai ji [Loveless] (2001)
血卡門 Xie kamen [Blood Carmen] (2001)
其後 Qihou [Thereafter] (2004)
沉默暗啞微小 Chenmo, anya, weixiao [Reticence, muteness, humility] (2004)
末日酒店 Mori jiudian [Doomsday hotel] (2011)
烈佬傳 Lielao zhuan, Children of Darkness (2012)
微喜重行 Weixi chongxing [The re-walking of Mei-hei] (2014)
盧麒之死 Luqi zhi si, The Death of Lo Kei (2018)

Prose and essays 
揚眉女子Yangmei nüzi [A proud woman] (1987)
我們如此很好 Women ruci henhao [We are quite okay like this] (1996)
又喊又笑：阿婆口述歷史 You han you xiao: apo koushu lishi [Tears and laughter: an oral history of Apo's lives] (1999, a compilation)
後殖民誌 Hou zhimin zhi [Postcolonial records] (2003)

References

Further reading
Janet Ng. "Writing from the Obverse: Wong Bik-Wan's Fiction and Nostalgia in Hong Kong". Modern Chinese Literature and Culture. Vol. 20, No. 1 (SPRING, 2008), pp. 44-71.
Mirana May Szeto.  "Intra-Local and Inter-Local Sinophone: Rhizomatic Politics of Hong Kong Writers Saisai and Wong Bik-wan". In

External links 
 媚行女子—黃碧雲
 香港文學/香港女性文學/香港女作家黃碧雲
 Wong Bik Wan (Huang Biyun)

Hong Kong women writers
1961 births
Living people
Hong Kong novelists